Erebus acuta is a moth of the family Erebidae. It is found in Burma.

References

Moths described in 1917
Erebus (moth)
Moths of Asia